Adriana Gerarda Antonia Maria (Anita) Smits (born 22 May 1967 in Oirschot, North Brabant) is a former archer from the Netherlands, who competed for her native country at the 1988 Summer Olympics in Seoul, South Korea. There she finished in 43rd position, with 1203 points.

References
 Seoul Official Games Results

1967 births
Living people
Archers at the 1988 Summer Olympics
Dutch female archers
Olympic archers of the Netherlands
People from Oirschot
Sportspeople from North Brabant
20th-century Dutch women
20th-century Dutch people